Lardoglyphus is a genus of mites in the monotypic family Lardoglyphidae, containing the following species:
Lardoglyphus angelinae Olsen, 1982
Lardoglyphus falconidus Philips & Norton, 1979
Lardoglyphus konoi (Sasa & Asanuma, 1951)
Lardoglyphus radovskyi Baker, 1990
Lardoglyphus robustisetosus Baker, 1990
Lardoglyphus zacheri Oudemans, 1927

References

Sarcoptiformes